Mohamed Ibrahim was an Egyptian diver. He competed in the men's 3 metre springboard event at the 1948 Summer Olympics.

References

External links
 

Year of birth missing
Possibly living people
Egyptian male divers
Olympic divers of Egypt
Divers at the 1948 Summer Olympics
Place of birth missing (living people)
20th-century Egyptian people